Since 1974, the French government has intermittently included a minister responsible for women's rights. The minister led the Ministry of Women's Rights.

Ministers 

 Isabelle Lonvis-Rome (Borne government)

References 

Women's ministries
Government ministries of France
1974 establishments in France
Women in France